Charles Reid (14 January 1864 - 25 October 1909)  was a Scotland international rugby union player.

Rugby Union career

Amateur career

Reid attended Edinburgh Academy, and played rugby union for the Edinburgh Academicals . He was still a schoolboy of the academy when first capped by Scotland. In the match against  in 1881, he played against his classmate Frank Wright at Raeburn Place. Frank Wright was also seventeen at the time but - as a boarder from Manchester - represented the England side. At the end of the match, both of the boys were carried on the shoulders of their fans back to Edinburgh Academy. He acquired a nickname of Hippo at the school; this does not refer to his being like a hippopotamus, but the fact that he didn't know the word for a horse, when asked once in an Ancient Greek class at the Edinburgh Academy.

After his schooling, he still played for Edinburgh Academicals.

He later played for Perthshire.

Provincial career

He played for Edinburgh District in the inter-city match against Glasgow District in 1880.

He later turned out for East of Scotland District that same season in their match against West of Scotland District in 1881.

International career

Reid vies with Ninian Finlay for the title of the youngest player ever to be capped for  - he was seventeen years and thirty six days old when he was capped against  on 19 February 1881; however, Reid had lived through an extra leap year day, when he was capped in 1881, so Finlay generally gets that title. He played at second row/lock.

As Allan Massie says, 
"Charles Reid's physique would never have appeared inadequate for any forward position; he was bigger than 's Tom Reid who was the biggest and heaviest forward the British Lions took to South Africa in 1955, and more or less the same height and weight as the great Willie John McBride."

Reid was 15 to 16 stone in weight, and 6 ft 3in. The first historian of Scottish rugby, R.J. Phillips says that Reid "carried no superfluous weight and was as active as a well-trained ten-stone man", but that also, from his viewpoint in the 1920s, he was "Scotland's greatest forward."

He played alongside some of the greats of the era including Ninian Finlay, Andrew Don Wauchope and Bill Maclagan. He was said to be a proficient tackler, excellent at dribbling and Scotland only lost four times in his twenty one caps. He captained Scotland in 1887 to their first Home Championship win, and also won scored tries.

He maintained an interest in rugby long after retiring from the game, and after the positional changes in the early 1890s, he wrote boldly:
"Give me a forward team like we had in Manchester in 1882, and I don't care how many threequarter backs you have; we could go through them. We dribbled very close, and backed up the other so well that they could not get away, and they had fliers like Bolton against us. Dribbling and tackling are the characteristics of the Scottish forwards, and on them we depend to win."

Medical career

He was a doctor by profession, and later ended up living in Selkirk.

Family

He was the brother of James Reid, who was capped five times for Scotland from 1871–75, including the very first rugby international.

References

Sources

 Bath, Richard (ed.) The Scotland Rugby Miscellany (Vision Sports Publishing Ltd, 2007 )
 Massie, Allan A Portrait of Scottish Rugby (Polygon, Edinburgh)

1909 deaths
1864 births
Rugby union players from Renfrewshire
People educated at Edinburgh Academy
Scottish rugby union players
Scotland international rugby union players
Edinburgh Academicals rugby union players
Perthshire RFC players
Edinburgh District (rugby union) players
East of Scotland District players
Rugby union forwards